Count Augustinos Ioannis Maria Kapodistrias (1778–1857) was a Greek soldier and politician. He was born in Corfu. and studied geology. Augustinos Kapodistrias was the younger brother of Viaros Kapodistrias and of the first Governor of Greece Ioannis Kapodistrias.

After Ioannis's assassination on 9 October 1831, Augustinos succeeded his brother as head of the governing council, and at the office of governor. His six-month rule was marked by political instability and the country's slide to anarchy.

References

Ελένη Γαρδίκα-Κατσιαδάκη, Ο ρόλος της Διάσκεψης του Λονδίνου στην πτώση του Αυγουστίνου Καποδίστρια, Μνήμων 10 (1985), p. 248-269. 

1778 births
1857 deaths
19th-century heads of state of Greece
19th-century prime ministers of Greece
Presidents of Greece
Military personnel from Corfu
Russian Party politicians
Nobility from Corfu
Members of the Filiki Eteria
Kapodistrias family
Greek people of Italian descent
Politicians from Corfu